The National Union for Democracy and Progress  (Union Nationale pour la Démocratie et le Progrès) is a political party of Benin. In the parliamentary election held on 31 March 2007, the party won two out of 83 seats.

References

Political parties in Benin
Political parties with year of establishment missing